Slow Pulp is an American indie rock band from Madison, Wisconsin, now based in Chicago, Illinois.

History
Slow Pulp began after childhood friends Teddy Mathews, Alex Leeds, and Henry Stoehr decided to start a band. This resulted in their first release, an EP titled EP1 in 2015. In 2017, they released a second EP titled EP2, which was the first release to feature new member Emily Massey. In 2019, the group released another EP titled Big Day. In 2020, Slow Pulp announced their debut full-length album, Moveys, which was released on October 9, 2020. The album received positive reviews.

Band members
Emily Massey (vocals/guitar)
Alex Leeds (bass/vocals)
Teddy Mathews (drums)
Henry Stoehr (guitar)

Discography

Studio albums
Moveys (2020, Winspear)

EPs
EP1 (2015, self-released)
EP2 (2017, self-released)
Big Day (2019, self-released)
Deleted Scenes (2021, Winspear)

References

Indie rock musical groups from Wisconsin